Epifania is a cartoon or full-scale drawing in black chalk by Michelangelo, produced in Rome around 1550–53. It is 2.32 metres tall by 1.65 m wide, and is made up of 26 sheets of paper.

The composition shows the Virgin Mary, with the Christ child sitting between her legs. An adult male figure to the right, probably St Joseph, is pushed away by Mary.  In front of him is the infant St John the Baptist. The adult figure standing to Mary's left is unidentified, as are other figures only just visible in the background. Michelangelo repeatedly changed the composition and its forms, as is apparent in the cartoon's alterations.  The composition was originally thought to be of the Three Kings, which may be the reason for the title, but is now understood as referring to Christ's siblings mentioned in the Gospels (explained by Saint Epiphanias—another possible source for the title—as Joseph's sons by a previous marriage, and hence Mary's stepsons, leaving their marriage unconsummated—hence her pushing Joseph away—and Mary forever a virgin).

Michelangelo's biographer Ascanio Condivi used this cartoon for an unfinished painting. A 19th-century Scottish collector, John Malcolm of Poltalloch, bought it for only £11 0s 6d. and, on John's death in 1893, his son John Wingfield Malcolm gave it to the British Museum. Parliament voted £25,000 to purchase the rest of his collection for the museum two years later.  The cartoon is on display in Gallery 90 of the Museum.

Notes

See also
Michelangelo

References
P. Barenboim (with Arthur Heath), Michelangelo’s Moment: The British Museum Madonna (LOOM, Moscow, 2018)
J.A. Gere and N. Turner, Drawings by Michelangelo in the British Museum, exhibition catalogue (London, The British Museum Press, 1975)
M. Hirst, Michelangelo and His Drawings (New Haven and London: Yale University Press, 1988)
M. Royalton-Kisch, H. Chapman and S. Coppel, Old Master Drawings from the Museum, exhibition catalogue (London, The British Museum Press, 1996)
J. Wilde, Italian drawings in the Department of Prints and Drawings, 2 (London, The British Museum Press, 1953)

External links
The British Museum's online description of Michelangelo's cartoon

Prints and drawings in the British Museum
Drawings by Michelangelo
1550s drawings